The Lunar Orbital Station (LOS) is a proposed Russian space station in orbit around the Moon. The design was presented in 2007 at a conference at the Gagarin Cosmonaut Training Center in Star City. It is one of the two parts of the planned Russian lunar infrastructure, the other part being a base on the surface of the Moon. 

LOS would have six docking ports, a high-power antenna for communications, maneuvering and attitude control engines, solar panels and a robotic arm. The station components would be launched atop a super heavy version of the Angara rocket. 

Russia has expressed discontent with its role in the international Lunar Gateway, which prompted the country to go ahead with the planning of its own lunar station. The launch of the first LOS module is proposed for 2025. Other reports state that NASA now accepted Russia's full participation in the international Gateway. In October 2020, Dmitry Rogozin, director general of Roscosmos, said that the Lunar Gateway program is too “U.S.-centric” for Roscosmos to participate in. In January 2021, Roscosmos announced that it will not participate in the program.

References

External links 
 Lunar Orbital Station, LOS

Proposed space stations
Exploration of the Moon
Space program of Russia
2030s in science